Karinda Singh is an Indian politician and is member of Uttar Pradesh Legislative Assembly representing Goverdhan assembly constituency of Mathura district as BJP MLA.

References

Bharatiya Janata Party politicians from Uttar Pradesh
Living people
Uttar Pradesh MLAs 2017–2022
People from Mathura
Year of birth missing (living people)